The 1928 Úrvalsdeild is an season of top-flight Icelandic football.

Overview
This year only three team entered and yet again, KR won the championship.

League standings

Results

References

Úrvalsdeild karla (football) seasons
Iceland
Iceland
Urvalsdeild